Larry Polansky (born 1954) is a composer, guitarist, mandolinist, and professor emeritus at Dartmouth College and the University of California, Santa Cruz. He is a founding member and co-director of Frog Peak Music (a composers' collective): . He co-wrote HMSL (Hierarchical Music Specification Language) with Phil Burk and David Rosenboom.

There are several recordings of his work, including  an album of mensuration canons, Four-Voice Canons. He also served as co-producer of Asmat Dream: New Music Indonesia, Vol. I.

He is the brother of novelist Steven Polansky.

Discography 

 freeHorn (2017, Cold Blue Music)
 Three Pieces for Two Pianos (2016, New World Records)
 The World's Longest Melody (2010, New World Records, featuring Zwerm guitar quartet)
 The Theory of Impossible Melody (1990, Artifact Recordings; 2008 Reissue on New World Records)
 Trios (2004, Pogus CDs, with Douglas Repetto, Tom Erbe, Chris Mann, Christian Wolff)
 Four Voice Canons (2002, Cold Blue Recordings)
 Change (2002, Artifact Recordings)
 Lonesome Road (2001, New World Records, featuring Martin Christ, piano)
 Simple Harmonic Motion (1994, Artifact Recordings)

Further reading
Dunn, David "The Theory of Impossible Melody". Liner notes essay. New World Records.
Beal, Amy C. "Nature is the Best Dictator". Liner notes essay. New World Records.

References

External links
 Larry Polansky's Dartmouth Page
 Frog Peak Artist: Larry Polansky
 Larry Polansky at Arcane Candy
 Larry Polansky Papers at New York University Fales Library & Special Collections

1954 births
20th-century classical composers
21st-century classical composers
American male classical composers
American classical composers
Dartmouth College faculty
Living people
Pupils of James Tenney
20th-century American guitarists
21st-century American guitarists
Experimental Music Studios alumni
20th-century American composers
American male guitarists
20th-century American male musicians
21st-century American male musicians